is a train station in the city of Nagano, Nagano Prefecture, Japan, operated jointly by East Japan Railway Company (JR East), with the third-sector railway operating company Shinano Railway.

Lines
Shinanoi Station is one of the intermediate terminals of the discontinuous the Shin'etsu Main Line, and is 9.3 kilometers from Nagano Station. It is also the terminus of the 66.7 kilometer Shinanoi Line. It is also the terminus for the Shinonoi Line and the 65.1 kilometer Shinano Railway Line.

Station layout
The station consists of a one ground-level island platform and one side platform, connected to the station building by a footbridge. The station has a  Midori no Madoguchi staffed ticket office.

Platforms

History 
Shinanoi Station was opened on 15 August 1888.  In the 1987 privatization of the Japanese National Railways (JNR), the station was assigned to the control of the East Japan Railway Company.

Passenger statistics
In fiscal 2015, the station was used by an average of 19,188 passengers daily (boarding passengers only).

Surrounding area
Shinonoi Post Office
Minami Nagano Sports Park Stadium, home of town football club AC Nagano Parceiro

See also
List of railway stations in Japan

References

External links

 Shinonoi Station (JR East)

Railway stations in Nagano Prefecture
Railway stations in Japan opened in 1888
Railway stations in Nagano (city)
Shin'etsu Main Line
Shinonoi Line
Shinano Railway Line
Stations of East Japan Railway Company